Visual Studies is a triannual peer-reviewed academic journal of visual studies published by Taylor & Francis on behalf of the International Visual Sociology Association. The journal was established in 1986 as Visual Sociology, obtaining its current name in 2002. The editor-in-chief is Darren Newbury (University of Brighton). The journal  is abstracted and indexed in the International Bibliography of the Social Sciences, Scopus, and the Arts & Humanities Citation Index.

References

External links 
 

English-language journals
Taylor & Francis academic journals
Sociology journals
Media studies journals
Anthropology journals
Triannual journals
Publications established in 1986